"Only Believe" is a song written by evangelist Paul Rader.

Elvis Presley released it in 1971 as a two-sided single with the song "Life" on the reverse side. Both songs were from the upcoming album Love Letters from Elvis.

On Billboard Hot 100 the single charted as "Life / Only Believe", peaking at number 53.

Critical response 
Billboard reviewed the single "Only Believe / Life" in its May 8, 1971 issue. The magazine characterizes the song "Life" as "a gospel oriented ballad that builds into a heavy production."

Charts 

 * as "Life / Only Believe"

References 

1971 singles
Elvis Presley songs
RCA Records singles
Gospel songs
Rock ballads